Mister Mugg is a 1933 short American pre-Code comedy film directed by James W. Horne. It was nominated for an Academy Award at the 6th Academy Awards in 1933 for Best Short Subject (Comedy). The Academy Film Archive preserved Mister Mugg in 2012.

Cast
 James Gleason
 Dorothy Christy
 Ben Alexander
 Otis Harlan
 Jack Pennick
 Fred Warren

References

External links

1933 films
1933 comedy films
1933 short films
American black-and-white films
Films directed by James W. Horne
Universal Pictures short films
American comedy short films
1930s English-language films
1930s American films